Gregg McNally (born 2 January 1991) is an Ireland international rugby league footballer plays as a  for Oldham RLFC in the RFL League 1.

Background
McNally was born in Whitehaven, Cumbria, England, he has Irish ancestors, and eligible to play for Ireland due to the grandparent rule.

Career

Huddersfield Giants
McNally was transferred from Whitehaven to the Huddersfield Giants during November 2008, after which he made his début in a friendly match against Halifax on Sunday 4 January 2009 and then returned to Whitehaven on loan for a season.

At youth level McNally scored 18 points to take Whitehaven School to the 2006–2007 national Champion Schools final, going on to take his team to victory in the final with three tries, qualifying for European competition.

Leigh Centurions
McNally joined Leigh Centurions in time for the 2012 season. At the Leigh Centurions McNally has won 1 Northern Rail Cup, 3 League Leaders' Shield, and 1 Kingstone Press Championship Grand Final.

Bradford Bulls
In January 2018 NcNally joined Bradford Bulls on a two-year deal. He was released by the Bulls in January 2019 on compassionate grounds.

Whitehaven
On 4 December 2020 it was reported that McNally will return to Whitehaven for the 2021 season

Rochdale Hornets
On 22 Oct 2021 it was reported that he had signed for Rochdale Hornets in the RFL League 1

International honours
In 2010 he represented Ireland at the Alitalia European Cup. Despite Ireland coming fourth of four McNally was the top points scorer of the competition.

He also represented Ireland in the 2011 Autumn International Series, and the 2012 European Cup.

In 2016 he was called up to the Ireland squad for the 2017 Rugby League World Cup European Pool B qualifiers.

References

External links
Profile at bradfordbulls.co.uk
Profile at bradfordbulls.co.uk
Profile at leighrl.co.uk
Profile at giantsrl

1991 births
Living people
Barrow Raiders players
Bradford Bulls players
Cumbria rugby league team players
English people of Irish descent
English rugby league players
Huddersfield Giants players
Ireland national rugby league team players
Leigh Leopards players
Oldham R.L.F.C. players
Rochdale Hornets players
Rugby league fullbacks
Rugby league halfbacks
Rugby league five-eighths
Rugby league players from Whitehaven
Whitehaven R.L.F.C. players